Lil'B is a Japanese female pop duo, consisting of singer Mie and rapper Aila. They debuted in 2008 with "Orange," the 15th ending theme song for the anime Bleach. They are best known for their song "Kimi ni Utatta Love Song," which topped the RIAJ's monthly ringtone chart in 2008. They are also well known for their single "Tsunaida Te", which was the 3rd ending theme song for the anime Fullmetal Alchemist: Brotherhood.

The group's stage name comes from a contraction of the word little, and the first letter of the word betray.

Discography

Albums

Singles

* charted on monthly ringtone (Chaku-uta) Reco-kyō Chart. All other releases charted on  the RIAJ Chaku-uta Full Chart, established April 2009.

References

External links 
 
Sony label site 

Defstar Records artists
Musical groups established in 2007
Japanese musical duos